Carl² (Carl Squared) is a Canadian animated series which explores what would happen if a teenager had a clone. The concept of the series is a mixture of biological studies and normal teenage life.

Plot
Carl Crashman is a lazy 14-year-old who is only good at one thing: slacking. After a rough day and being tired of constantly doing things he hated, he was blogging on the Internet and complaining about his life when he accidentally ordered a clone from a spam e-mail using his fingerprint, a yearbook photo and a scabby bandage; Carl is shocked when an online cloning company sends him an exact clone of himself in a box. Carl names him C2. Even though C2 looks like Carl, talks like him (albeit with a higher-pitched voice), and walks like him, C2 is more ambitious, hard-working, and charming, much to Carl's advantage. Since C2 arrived, Carl has been slacking off a lot more. However, C2 often does the opposite to what Carl wants. Carl decides to keep C2 a secret from everyone else except his best friend Jamie James.

The show's theme song depicts the initial arrival of C2 at Carl's house. There are two different versions of the theme songs, each version having a new opening sequence and slightly alternate lyrics. As of Season 2, the opening sequence includes more on how C2 was created in the cloning lab.

Characters

Carl Crashman
Carl Crashman is a lazy, stereotypical teenager who has mastered the art of slacking off and finding ways not to spend time with his family. His hobbies include reading comic books, using his computer, playing video games, verbally blogging online, and skateboarding. Carl likes to spend time with his best friend Jamie and girlfriend Skye. He is somewhat obnoxious and often careless and insensitive, much to Skye's dismay.

Although Carl is often frustrated with C2, it has been proven (in the episode Clone Come Home) that without C2, his life would be a nauseating, never-ending cycle and that Carl would be totally lost without him. In the episode Clone Scene Investigation, Mr. Agar commented that Carl was "the poster boy for slackers everywhere".

In Season 1, Carl wears an orange shirt, light blue jeans, and white bouncers. As of Season 2, Carl wears a brown shirt, dark blue jeans, and green and white bouncers.

He is voiced by Stuart Stone.

C2
C2 looks like, sounds like (albeit with a higher-pitched voice), and walks like Carl. As an identical clone of Carl, he can pass as him, whenever Carl doesn't want to do something, C2 is the one who is there to substitute. He's much sweeter and more naive than his DNA donor, however, and also much more motivated. He enjoys being at Carl's service, and fails to see that Carl allows him to go to school, not as a favour, but to prevent himself from having to exert any kind of effort.

Not only does he have 95% of Carl's DNA but also 5% of him is from Rex (because the dog apparently contaminated the sample), which is probably why he enjoys catching Frisbees in his mouth and eating dog treats. C2 has two webbed toes together, unlike Carl.

C2 wears the same clothing as Carl throughout the show. Though unlike Carl, C2 wears his shirt tucked in.

He is also voiced by Stuart Stone.

Jamie James
Carl's best friend who is the only other person to know about C2. Aside from being an African-Canadian ally of Carl, he always carries around a camcorder, shooting random movies for his documentaries, especially Carl's skateboarding moves. He talks gangster most of the time, such as, "What up with your fine self?". Jamie goes to great lengths to keep C2 a secret for Carl, proving that he is truly Carl's best friend.

In Season 1, he wears a blue visor, a blue T-shirt over his white shirt, and purple pants. As of Season 2, he wears a flipped white visor, a yellow T-shirt, and black pants.

He is voiced by Jordan Francis.

Skye Flower Blue
Sky is Carl's vegetarian girlfriend who is passionate about social justice issues, such as environmentalism and animal rights.

In Season 1, she wears orange over her white shirt. As of Season 2, she wears green along with a matching headband.

She is voiced by Bryn McAuley.

The Crashman family
Chloe Crashman – Carl's rebellious 16-year-old sister. As a Goth, she always likes to think of negative things and has dark death parties in the cemetery. She hates anything sweet and she always likes to ignore her family. She has a boyfriend, Damien. In some instances, it is shown that Chloe and her brother have a love–hate relationship. In Season 2, her appearance appears to be more Gothic than in past seasons. Her hair is now combed-down and shoulder-length. She wears black over a striped black-and-white T-shirt. When she was sick, she wore a blood red and black robe. Her eyes now seem darker than usual. She is voiced by Emily Hampshire.
Janet Crashman – A psychiatrist and mother to Carl and Chloe. She quit her job as a psychiatrist upon seeing how her children were acting: Chloe seemed to have a really weird, dark personality and Carl had two separate personalities (or multiple personality disorder). Janet is an actual bother to Carl as she works hard to find out why Carl acts like two Carls. Carl often refers to her and Barney Crashman as the "rents" and her as "Dr. Mom", while C2 calls her "mommy". Several episodes indicate that she is very strict about Chloe wearing any inappropriate body art or piercing meant to represent her gothic nature, such as when she recalled a time where Chloe had a skull tattoo imprinted on her rear end that got removed (implying Janet herself may have found out about it and due to her maternal authority, attempted to force her to have it removed at once) and when Carl found out Chloe wore an eyebrow ring and endeavoured to tell their mother (Janet) that. She is voiced by Kathy Laskey.
Barney Crashman – The father of Carl and Chloe. He specializes in having ideas in making new things such as vegetable bacon and the notorious "Breakfast Dispenser". He also likes to fix things in the kitchen. His efforts alone aren't enough to succeed. He is voiced by Rick Roberts.
Rex – Carl's pet dog, Rex is a small beagle who is not really paid much attention to. C2 has 5% of his DNA which is probably why C2 enjoys playing with Rex and shares dog food with him.

Minor characters
Damien – Chloe's boyfriend and a loyal companion. He always hangs out with Chloe and is seen doing dark rituals with her. However, the problem is, he is afraid of the dark. He is also very talented at shooting hoops and joins the basketball team in one episode. While sharing the same passions than Chloe, his language is more refined, and an episode even hints that he may be interested in classical music. In Season 1, he has red hair and wears a purple shirt inside his black jacket. Damien also shows interest in dancing, much to Chloe's dismay. In Season 2, he has blue hair and wears a black shirt with a skull on it. He is voiced by Matthew Ferguson.
Mr. Agar – Carl's homeroom teacher. He detests Carl and always tries to look for a reason to get him into trouble. Whenever Carl doesn't fail on a test or he successfully passes an assignment, Mr. Agar always accuses Carl of cheating. He also had Carl's sister, Chloe, as a student (which might be a possible explanation as to why he dislikes Carl). He expressed (various times) his irritation and dislike of the Crashman bloodline and he is smart. He is voiced by Paul Pogue.
Lorna Gail Lookman – Carl's nosy next door neighbor who has a hobby of looking into Carl's room with her binoculars. She likes Carl and wants to be his future wife. Her ideal day would be when Carl finally breaks up with Skye. Easily put, she is obsessed with Carl, even hiding lipstick-marked pictures of him in her closet. She is considered to be his devoted stalker. In Season 1, she is seen wearing a pink sweater over a white shirt. In Season 2, she now wears something that looks like a school uniform: a blue jacket over a white shirt and an olive-colored tie. She is voiced by Samantha Espie.
Principal Powers – The principal of Carl and Chloe's high school and he is the African-Canadian guy with glasses. He keeps his eyes peeled for trouble especially on trouble makers. His voice is often heard on the announcements and gives out serious punishment to trouble makers. He is very serious about his job and following the rules in the school. He is voiced by Martin Roach.

Relationships
Carl and Skye – Carl absolutely adores Skye and Skye's passion is to figure out her boyfriend. The couple rarely shares any common interests (except for each other), but they simply have a crush on each other. She is a major tree hugger, while he may be a slacker who is addicted to the computer and video games. But there is also a sweet sensitive side to him which always wins over.
Chloe and Damien – Chloe and Damien are both Goth, but it has been hinted that Damien is only Goth because he wants to be with Chloe. It has always been hinted that Damien loves Chloe a lot and would do practically anything to stay with her. Their relationship is somewhat similar to Carl and Skye's. While the couple lack thought in each other's interests, they would sacrifice their lack of interest for the person they love.
C2 and Lorna – In several episodes, C2 was considered to be Lorna's love interest. The problem is, Lorna is Carl's most devoted stalker and Carl already has Skye. While this would seem like forbidden love, C2 shows no sign of giving up anytime soon.

Episodes 
The show is divided into 4 seasons of 13 episodes each, with the exception of the first one, which includes 26 episodes. A number of episodes are specials and are not regularly aired; these are indicated.

There are 2 two-part episodes in the show, one in Season 2 and the other in Season 4. The Season 2 one was made as a contest; after the first part of the episode, Teletoon viewers were asked to vote online and by text messaging to determine who would be the winner out of the remaining 3 contestants, Carl, Jamie, and Skye. The winner was announced in the second part of the episode. The Season 4 one was made as a mystery; after the first part of the episode, Teletoon viewers were asked to go to the show's website and try to solve it. The solution was announced in the second part of the episode.

Carl² first aired on August 7, 2005 as a sneak preview of the first episode. However, regular airings of the show only started on September 3, 2005.

Series overview

Season 1 (2005–06)

Season 2 (2006–07)

Season 3 (2007)

Season 4 (2010–11)

Production 
Development of the series began in 2002, with an expected budget of $450,000 per episode. At the time, the commissioning broadcaster was Family Channel, and it was uncertain whether the first season would have 13 or 26 episodes. Family remained the original network for the upcoming show well into 2003.

Teletoon's vice president of programming described the series as sharing a sense of humour with the popular earlier Teletoon original What's with Andy?.

Release

Broadcast
Aside from Teletoon in Canada, the series also aired on numerous other channels in over 100 countries. In Australia, the show was initially broadcast on ABC1 and ABC2, and later on ABC3 as well. In the U.S, it was shown on Jetix from September 15, 2005 to July 14, 2008. and also on the Spanish-language ¡Sorpresa!.

Streaming
Some, but not all, of the first season was made available by the distributor Portfolio Entertainment on the company's YouTube channel on June 22, 2017. More episodes from the first and second seasons were added on September 13.

As of September 28, Amazon Video also carries the show via Kid Genius Cartoons Plus!, spanning the first two seasons and part of the third.

The entire series has been released on Tubi TV.

References

External links

 Production website

2000s Canadian animated television series
2005 Canadian television series debuts
2011 Canadian television series endings
2010s Canadian animated television series
Canadian children's animated comedy television series
Canadian flash animated television series
English-language television shows
Teletoon original programming
Teen animated television series
Television series about cloning
Television shows set in Ontario
Television shows set in Toronto
Television shows filmed in Ontario
Television shows filmed in Toronto